The Bylliones were an Illyrian tribe that lived near the Adriatic coast of southern Illyria (modern Albania), on the lower valley of the Vjosa river, in the hinterland of Apollonia. The Bylliones were firstly attested in epigraphic material from the oracle of Dodona dating back to the 4th century BC, and their koinon was firstly attested in a 3rd century BC inscription from the same oracle. Their territory was trapezoidal on the right side of the rivers Luftinje and Vjosa, extending in the west to the Mallakastra mountains. The chief city of their koinon was Byllis. Another important centre of their koinon was Klos, an earlier Illyrian settlement later called Nikaia, as an inscription attests. The Bylliones also inhabited in the area of an ancient sanctuary of the eternal fire called Nymphaion.

Through contact with their Greek neighbours, the Bylliones became Hellenized and bilingual during the height of Molossian rule in the region in the 3rd century BCE. Their koinon minted coins as attested by inscriptions reporting their ethnicon in Greek letters. The koinon of the Bylliones survived until Roman Imperial times. In the Roman era, the Bylliones reappear in the late 1st century CE when they are mentioned by Pliny the Elder in the Natural History (c. 79 CE) as one of the "barbarian" tribes which lived in the area of Nymphaeum. The koinon of the Bylliones and the koinon of the Amantes were the most notable Illyrian koina.

Name 

Their name is recorded as Boulinoi by Pseudo-Scymnus (404), Boulimeis by Dionysius Periegetes (386), Ballini by Livy (44. 30), Bylliones by Strabo (7. 7. 8), Buliones by Pliny (3. 21/139). Bronze coins dating back to the period 230 BC – 148 BC have been found in the site of Byllis, bearing the legend ΒΥΛΛΙΟΝΩΝ.

Geography 

There is not a certain geographic extension of the community of the Bylliones, whose territorial and ethnic institution is documented to have existed since the 5th-4th century BC, as evidenced by epigraphic material from the oracle of Dodona. Byllis seems to have constituted the main center of the Bylliones. Another important center of the Bylliones was Klos, a more ancient Illyrian settlement later called Nikaia, as an inscription attests. The Bylliones formed a koinon, which was firstly attested in a 3rd century BC inscription, also this time from Dodona. Livy (1st century BC) called their territory Bullinum agrum.

Byllis foundation is traditionally attributed to the middle of the 4th century BC, when the Illyrian massive walls were built. Its urban layout seems to have been structured around the middle of the 3rd century BC. It was built on a roughly 500 m hill on the right bank of the Vjosa river, one of the main river axes of central-southern Albania. The hill had a dominant view over the river's valley, and today's Mallakastra region, over much of which the koinon of the Bylliones stretched. The site permitted also to see the coastline while, towards the hinterland, the more internal centers.

The territory of the Bylliones was composed by a whole network of fortifications constructed to protect them from nearby Apollonians in the west and Atintanians in the east. It was delimited to the southeast by the fortifications of Rabije and Matohasanaj. The koinon of the Amantini was located on the opposite coast of the Vjosa

river. The proximity of the prehistoric burial tumulus at Lofkënd to both Byllis and Nymphaion indicates that the tumulus was located in the territory of the Bylliones.

Although still unproven, some scholars have suggested that the Bylliones may have once constituted a part of Atintania, which may have overshadowed with its name the koinon of Bylliones, and perhaps even the Amantes, in the ancient accounts during the years 230–197 BC. Despite the important place it occupied behind Apollonia, the community of the Bylliones was not mentioned, for instance, either in the treaty between Philip V of Macedon and Hannibal in 215 BC, nor in the terms of peace submitted to Philip V by the Aetolians in 208 BC, and neither in the Peace of Phoenice in 205 BC, when historical accounts report only Atintanes and Atintanina. It has been suggested that about 224 BC, when Atintania separated from Rome but remaining outside the dominion of the Illyrian dynast Demetrius of Pharos, the westernmost part of Atintanes began to organize themselves as a separate unit with the name "koinon of Bylliones", holding the support of the Epirote League. A koinon of the Bylliones is attested in epigraphic material from Dodona that has been dated about the last decades of the 3rd century BC. This koinon was most probably restricted to a southern Illyrian, non-Greek speaking, region without including parts of Epirus.

Culture

Language 

The idiom spoken by the Bylliones belonged to the southeastern Illyrian linguistic area. Through contact with their Greek neighbours, the Bylliones became Hellenized and bilingual in the 3rd century BCE, as indicated by Greek legends on their coins.

Religion 

Archaeological explorations have not yet found a sanctuary or temple in the city of Byllis, however, a series of inscriptions show the adoption of the cults of Zeus, Hera, Dionysius and Artemis. Another inscription indicates that the area included a fire sanctuary with an oracle, the Nymphaion located on the border with nearby Apollonia. The nymphaeum also appears as a fire symbol engraved on coins of Byllis minted in the 3rd-2nd century BC. A relief found near Byllis also shows the nymphs and a cloth wrapped around this fire, a scene that is repeated only with the nymphs depicted on a 1st century BC silver coin of Apollonia, suggesting an admixture of local traditions and religions with the forms and practices brought by Greek colonists. Under Greek influence the local Illyrian spontaneous and naturalistic cult started its canonization. In the sanctuary of Dodona a 4th century BC inscription on a lead foil reports Bylliones asking to which deity they should sacrifice in order to ensure the safety of their possessions. By the end of the 3rd century BC, the Bylliones appear among the lists of theorodokoi at Delphi.

Economy 

The koinon of the Bylliones minted its own coins in the period between 230 BC and 148 BC.

See also 
List of ancient tribes in Illyria

References

Bibliography 

Illyrian tribes
Illyrian Albania
Ancient tribes in Albania